NXT TakeOver: Rival was the fourth NXT TakeOver professional wrestling livestreaming event produced by WWE. It was held exclusively for wrestlers from the promotion's developmental territory, NXT. The event aired exclusively on the WWE Network and took place on February 11, 2015, at NXT's home arena, Full Sail University in Winter Park, Florida.

The main event of the show saw Sami Zayn defend the NXT Championship against former friend Kevin Owens in a match that played off their shared history prior to signing with WWE. Also on the show, Charlotte defended the NXT Women's Championship against Sasha Banks, Becky Lynch, and Bayley in a fatal four-way match, and Blake and Murphy defended the NXT Tag Team Championship against former champions The Lucha Dragons (Kalisto and Sin Cara) in their rematch. The show also featured the finals of a tournament to determine the number one contender to the NXT Championship, as well as two other matches.

Production

Background
TakeOver was a series of professional wrestling shows that began in May 2014, as WWE's then-developmental league NXT held their second WWE Network-exclusive event, billed as TakeOver. In subsequent months, the "TakeOver" moniker became the brand used by WWE for all of their NXT live specials. Rival was scheduled as the fourth NXT TakeOver event and took place on February 11, 2015, at NXT's home arena, Full Sail University in Winter Park, Florida.

Storylines

The card comprised six matches. The matches resulted from scripted storylines, where wrestlers portrayed heroes, villains, or less distinguishable characters that built tension and culminated in a wrestling match or series of matches. Results were predetermined by WWE's writers on the NXT brand, while storylines were produced on their weekly television program, NXT.

The main event of the TakeOver: Rival was a storyline between long time real life friends and often in-ring opponents Sami Zayn and Kevin Owens. The storyline played on the decade long friendship between the two, predating both of them working for WWE, back when they were known as Kevin Steen (Owens) and El Generico (Zayn). The two became friends when they worked for the Canadian International Wrestling Syndicate IWS and later on won several tag team championships as Kevin Steen and El Generico including the PWG World Tag Team Championship twice and the ROH World Tag Team Championship. While they were close friends the two also had a very intense storyline feud in Ring of Honor (ROH) that lasted from late 2009 until late 2012 where Zayn signed a contract with WWE. Steen, given the ring name Kevin Owens signed a WWE contract during the summer of 2014, joining Zayn in NXT. During the build to Owens' debut at TakeOver: R Evolution they acknowledge the past history of Zayn and Owens, citing their friendship. At "R Evolution" Owens won his debut match against CJ Parker and then later on in the night Zayn defeated Adrian Neville to win the NXT Championship. After the victory Owens came to the ring to congratulate Zayn on the victory, but then turned on him and attacked Zayn, performing a Powerbomb onto the ring apron on Zayn. On January 14, 2015 Zayn successfully defended the championship against Neville, only to be attacked by Owens after the match once more. At the following NXT show Zayn demanded a match against Owens, with Owens pushing back saying he was a "prize fighter" and would only fight Zayn if the NXT Championship was on the line, a stipulation Zayn agreed to.

In the weeks prior to the TakeOver: Rival show NXT held a tournament to determine the next challenger to the NXT Championship, announcing the tournament before Owens goaded Zayn into giving him a match for the championship. The eight man tournament included Finn Bálor, Curtis Axel, Hideo Itami, Tyler Breeze, Tyson Kidd, Adrian Neville, Baron Corbin and Bull Dempsey. The first round of the tournament was broadcast on January 21 and 28 with Balor, Itami, Neville and Corbin all advancing to the semi-finals. The semi-finals of the tournament was shown on the WWE Network on February 4 and saw Balor and Neville qualify for the finals that would take place at TakeOver: Rival.

On January 15, 2015 (shown on January 28) the team of Blake and Murphy upset the reigning NXT Tag Team Champions The Lucha Dragons (Kalisto and Sin Cara) to win the championship. Prior to the victory the team had only won a few matches since they became a regular tag team six months prior, so the title victory was seen as a surprise. Following the title change NXT quickly announced a rematch between the two teams for TakeOver: Rival.

Event

Preliminary matches 
The event opened with Hideo Itami facing Tyler Breeze. Itami executed a "Shotgun Kick" on Breeze for the win.

Next, Baron Corbin and Bull Dempsey in a No Disqualification match. Corbin executed the "End of Days" to win the match.

After that, Blake and Murphy defended the NXT Tag Team Championship against The Lucha Dragons (Kalisto and Sin Cara). After Murphy executed a brainbuster on Cara, Blake followed with a "Six Star Frog Splash" for the pinfall to retain the title.

The next match between Adrian Neville and Finn Bálor was to determine the #1 contender for the NXT Championship. During the match, Bálor performed a running front dropkick on Neville, who was leaning against the guardrail. Balor performed a diving double foot stomp to the back of Neville's head for a near-fall. Neville executed a Phoenix splash off the middle rope for a near-fall. In the end, Bálor performed a running front dropkick on Neville, knocking him into the turnbuckles, followed by a "Coup De Grace" to win the match.

In the penultimate match, NXT Women's Championship Charlotte defended her title against Sasha Banks, Bayley and Becky Lynch in a fatal four way match. During the match, Lynch performed an exploder suplex on Charlotte for a near-fall. Bayley performed a "Bayley-to-Belly Suplex" off the top rope on Charlotte, but Banks broke up the pinfall attempt. Banks performed a Banks Statement on Charlotte before altering it into a crucifix and pinned her to win the title.

Main event
In the main event, Sami Zayn defended his NXT Championship against Kevin Owens. During the match, Zayn performed a "Blue Thunder Bomb" on Owens for a near-fall. After Owens executed a pop-up powerbomb for a near-fall, Zayn appeared to be injured. Medical personnel repeatedly checked on him. After Owens performed another four powerbombs, Owens was declared the winner by technical knockout. As a result, Owens won the NXT Championship.

Aftermath
Owens defended the NXT Championship against Sami Zayn at the following TakeOver, TakeOver: Unstoppable, again the match ended without a pinfall as Owens injured Zayn, attacking him until Samoa Joe made his shocking surprise debut for NXT and stopped Owens from attacking further.

Results

NXT Championship #1 Contender's Tournament bracket

References 

Rival
2015 in professional wrestling in Florida
2015 WWE Network events
Events in Florida
Professional wrestling in Winter Park, Florida
February 2015 events in the United States